The Three Treasures or Three Jewels are theoretical cornerstones in traditional Chinese medicine and practices such as , , and .

Despeux summarizes:

Etymology and meaning
This Chinese name  originally referred to the Daoist "Three Treasures" from the Daodejing, chapter 67: "pity", "frugality", and "refusal to be 'foremost of all things under heaven'". This latter use is misleading, however, as the Three Jewels in Buddhism is a completely different philosophy. The Buddha is the teacher, the Dharma is the teaching, and the Sangha is the community. The Three Jewels of Buddhism are the external supports for achieving realization, while the Three Treasures of Daoism are interior qualities or attitudes to be cultivated.

In long-established Chinese traditions, the "Three Treasures" are the essential energies sustaining human life:
   "nutritive essence, essence; spirit, sperm, seed; extract; refined, perfected"
   "breath, spirit; air, vapor; vitality, energy, force; vigor; attitude"
   "spirit; soul, mind; god, deity; supernatural being"

Neidan 

The Daoist "Mind-Seal Scripture of the Exalted Jade Sovereign" (, or the "Imprint of the Heart", is a valuable early source about the Three Treasures.

Frederic H. Balfour's brief essay about the "Imprint of the Heart" contains the earliest known Western reference to the Three Treasures:

Four stages 
In  ("internal alchemy") practice, transmuting the Three Treasures is expressed through the sequence:
 
 "laying the foundations"
 
 "refining essence into breath"
 
 "refining breath into spirit"
 
 "refining spirit and reverting to emptiness"

Sanyuan 
Both  and Neo-Confucianism distinguish the between "prior to heaven", referring to what is innate or natural, and "posterior to heaven", referring to what is acquired in the course of life.

The former are the "three origins":
 "Original essence"
 "Original breath"
 "Original spirit"

Xing 

Chinese culture 
The Journey to the West (late 16th century CE) novel refers to the Three Treasures when an enlightened Daoist patriarch instructs Sun Wukong ("Monkey") with a poem that begins:

References

Bibliography 

 
 
 
 
 
 
 .

External links
Essential Matter, Vital Breath, and Spirit, Taoist Culture & Information Centre
THE 3 TREASURES OF LIFE: Jing/Qi/Shen, Frances Gander

Chinese words and phrases
3 Three Treasures (Traditional Chinese Medicine)
Traditional Chinese medicine
Taoist philosophy